Chioma Matthews (née Ezeogu, born 12 March 1981) is an English female athlete who competes in the triple jump event and also played netball for England. She has a personal best distance of 13.53 metres in the triple jump.

Netball career
Matthews, playing for Brunel Hurricanes, was part of the inaugural Netball Superleague formed in 2005. She then went on to compete in the sport of netball for England at the 2006 Commonwealth Games in Melbourne, Australia and won a bronze medal.

Athletics career
Matthews switched sports to athletics at the relatively late age of 28 and competed at the 2014 Commonwealth Games in Glasgow, Scotland in the triple jump finishing 8th.

References

1981 births
Living people
English netball players
British female triple jumpers
Athletes (track and field) at the 2014 Commonwealth Games
Netball Superleague players
Surrey Storm players
London Pulse players
Netball players at the 2006 Commonwealth Games
AENA Super Cup players
Commonwealth Games medallists in netball
Commonwealth Games bronze medallists for England
Medallists at the 2006 Commonwealth Games